Sir Samuel Knox Cunningham, 1st Baronet, QC (3 April 1909 – 29 July 1976), was a Northern Irish barrister, businessman and politician. As an Ulster Unionist politician at a time when the Unionists were part of the Conservative Party, he was also a significant figure in United Kingdom politics as Parliamentary Private Secretary to Harold Macmillan. His nephew was Sir Josias Cunningham.

Early career
Cunningham was from an Ulster family.  His father was Samuel Cunningham, and his mother was Janet Muir Knox (nee McCosh) of Dalry, Ayrshire. His elder brothers were Colonel James Glencairn Cunningham, Josias Cunningham stockbroker, Dunlop McCosh Cunningham owner of Murrays tobacco works, Belfast. He was sent to the Royal Belfast Academical Institution, and then to Fettes College in Edinburgh. He then won a place at Clare College, Cambridge - where he was heavy-weight boxing champion.  The Cunningham family still remain prominent landowners around the Parkgate area of South Antrim with relatives including great nephews Joe, Richard and Garret still residing on the family estate.  The family had considerable business interests in land, Tobacco, commerce and finance.

From 1931 Cunningham went into business in Northern Ireland. He married Dorothy Enid Riley JP on 2 July 1935. Later in the 1930s, Cunningham studied law and was called to the Bar by the Middle Temple in 1939. During the Second World War he served in the Scots Guards although he continued his legal studies, and called to the Bar in Northern Ireland in 1942. He fought the Belfast West by-election in 1943 and the same seat in the 1945 general election.

After the war Cunningham mainly lived in Orpington, although he retained membership of the Ulster Unionist Council. His religious faith led him to be involved with the World Alliance of YMCAs from 1947, and he was Chairman of the National Council of the YMCA in 1949. In 1954 he was elected to Orpington Urban District Council.  Later he maintained a home, the Derhams House, near Minchinhampton, Gloucestershire.

Parliament
In the 1955 general election, Cunningham was chosen as the new Ulster Unionist MP for South Antrim. He was a delegate to the Council of Europe and Western European Union Parliamentary Assembly from 1956 to 1959. He also served as Parliamentary Private Secretary to Jocelyn Simon, Financial Secretary to the Treasury, from 1958. In 1959 he was made a Queen's Counsel.

After the 1959 general election, Cunningham was picked by Prime Minister Harold Macmillan as his Parliamentary Private Secretary, responsible for the Prime Minister's relations with backbench Conservative MPs. He was also a member of the National Executive of the Conservative and Unionist Party. When Macmillan resigned, he awarded Cunningham a baronetcy in his resignation honours.

Post-Parliamentary career
Cunningham remained on the backbenches, known as one to the right of Ulster Unionism and a friend of Ian Paisley, through the rest of the 1960s, he frequently clashed with Harold Wilson during this period, but decided to retire at the 1970 general election. He was Master of the Drapers Company in 1973–74. He was Provincial Grand Master of the Masonic Order in Gloucestershire from 1970-76. He was a member of the Apprentice Boys Club in Derry and attended the 275th Anniversary of the shutting of the gates.  Throughout his life he represented the old landed interests of Ulster and remained personally wealthy through family inheritance.  He died suddenly at Derhams House, Minchinhampton on 29 July 1976 at the age of sixty-seven.

Military intelligence, the RUC and victims named Cunningham as a paedophile and identified his close links to the sex offender ring at Kincora Boys' Home but MI5 deny this.

References

Sources
M. Stenton and S. Lees, Who's Who of British MPs, vol. IV (Harvester Press, 1981).

1909 births
1976 deaths
Scots Guards officers
Alumni of Clare College, Cambridge
Baronets in the Baronetage of the United Kingdom
People educated at Fettes College
Members of the Parliament of the United Kingdom for County Antrim constituencies (since 1922)
Members of the Middle Temple
Members of the Bar of Northern Ireland
UK MPs 1955–1959
UK MPs 1959–1964
UK MPs 1964–1966
UK MPs 1966–1970
Parliamentary Private Secretaries to the Prime Minister
Ulster Unionist Party members of the House of Commons of the United Kingdom
People educated at the Royal Belfast Academical Institution
Businesspeople from Northern Ireland
20th-century American lawyers
Northern Ireland King's Counsel
Protestants from Northern Ireland
YMCA leaders